was a Japanese Buddhist monk credited with founding the Tendai school of Buddhism based on the Chinese Tiantai school he was exposed to during his trip to Tang China beginning in 804. He founded the temple and headquarters of Tendai at Enryaku-ji on Mount Hiei near Kyoto. He is also said to have been the first to bring tea to Japan. After his death, he was awarded the posthumous title of Dengyō Daishi (伝教大師).

Life

Early life 

Saichō was born in the year 767 in the city of Ōmi, in present Shiga Prefecture, with the given name of Hirono. According to family tradition, Saichō's ancestors were descendants of emperors of Eastern Han China; however, no positive evidence exists for this claim. The region where Saichō was born did have a large Chinese immigrant population, so Saichō likely did have Chinese ancestry.

During Saichō's time, the Buddhist temples in Japan were officially organized into a national network known as the provincial temple system, and at the age of 13, Saichō became a disciple of one Gyōhyō (722–797, 行表). He took tonsure as a novice monk at the age of 14 and was given the ordination name "Saichō". Gyōhyō in turn was a disciple of Dao-xuan (702–760, 道璿, Dōsen in Japanese), a prominent monk from China of the Tiantai school who had brought the East Mountain Teaching of Chan Buddhism, Huayan teachings and the Bodhisattva Precepts of the Brahmajala Sutra to Japan in 736 and served as the "precept master" for ordination prior to the arrival of Jianzhen.

By the age of 20, he undertook the full monastic precepts at the Tōdai-ji, thus becoming a fully ordained monk in the official temple system. A few months later he abruptly retreated to Mount Hiei for an intensive study and practice of Buddhism, though the exact reason for his departure remains unknown. Shortly after his retreat, he composed his  which included his personal vows to: 
 So long as I have not attained the stage where my six faculties are pure, I will not venture out into the world.
 So long as I have not realized the absolute, I will not acquire any special skills or arts [e.g. medicine, divination, calligraphy, etc.].
 So long as I have not kept all the precepts purely, I will not participate in any lay donor's Buddhist meetings.
 So long as I have not attained wisdom (lit. hannya 般若), I will not participate in worldly affairs unless it be to benefit others.
 May any merit from my practice in the past, present and future be given not to me, but to all sentient beings so that they may attain supreme enlightenment.

In time, Saichō attracted other monks both on Mount Hiei, and from the Buddhist community in Nara, and a monastic community developed on Mount Hiei, which eventually became Enryaku-ji. Saichō was said to have carved an image of the Bhaiṣajyaguru and enshrined it. Additionally, he lit a lamp of oil before the Buddha and prayed that the lamp would never be extinguished.

The capital of Japan was moved from Nara to Nagaoka-kyō in 784, and then to Kyoto in 795. Because Mount Hiei was coincidentally located to the northeast of Kyoto, a direction considered dangerous according to Chinese geomancy, Saichō's presence on the mountain was thought to protect the new capital and brought him to the attention of the court. Saichō and his community on Mount Hiei also started to correspond and exchange ceremonies with the established communities in Nara, in addition to the monks at the Court, further enhancing his prestige.

One of Saichō's earliest supporters in the Court was Wake no Hiroyo, who invited Saichō to give lectures at Takaosan-ji along with fourteen other eminent monks. Saichō was not the first to be invited, indicating that he was still relatively unknown in the Court, but rising in prominence.

Trip to China 

The success of the Takaosanji lectures, plus Saichō's association with Wake no Hiroyo soon caught the attention of Emperor Kanmu who consulted with Saichō about propagating his Buddhist teachings further, and to help bridge the traditional rivalry between the East Asian Yogācāra and East Asian Mādhyamaka schools.

The emperor granted a petition by Saichō to journey to China to further study Tiantai doctrine in China and bring back more texts. Saichō was expected to only remain in China for a short time however.

Saichō could read Chinese but was unable to speak it at all, thus he was allowed to bring a trusted disciple along named , who apparently could speak Chinese. Gishin would later become one of the head monks of the Tendai order after Saichō.

Saichō was part of the four-ship diplomatic mission to Tang China in 803. The ships were forced to turn back due to heavy winds, where they spent some time at Dazaifu, Fukuoka. During this time, Saichō likely met another passenger, Kūkai, a fellow Buddhist monk who was sent to China on a similar mission though he was expected to stay much longer.

When the ships set sail again, two sank during a heavy storm, but Saichō's ship arrived at the port of Ningbo, then known as Mingzhou, in northern Zhejiang in 804. Shortly after arrival, permission was granted for Saichō and his party to travel to Tiantai Mountain and he was introduced to the seventh Patriarch of Tiantai, Daosui, who became his primary teacher during his time in China. Daosui was instrumental in teaching Saichō about Tiantai methods of meditation, monastic discipline and orthodox teachings. Saichō remained under this instruction for approximately 135 days.

Saichō spent the next several months copying various Buddhist works with the intention of bringing them back to Japan with him. While some works existed in Japan already, Saichō felt that they suffered from copyist errors or other defects, and so he made fresh copies. Once the task was completed, Saichō and his party returned to Ningbo, but the ship was harbored in Fuzhou at the time, and would not return for six weeks.

During this time, Saichō went to Yuezhou (越州, modern-day Shaoxing) and sought out texts and information on Vajrayana (Esoteric) Buddhism. The Tiantai school originally only utilized "mixed" ceremonial practices, but over time esoteric Buddhism took on a greater role. By the time Saichō had arrived in China, a number of Tiantai Buddhist centers provided esoteric training, and both Saichō and Gishin received initiation at a temple in Yue Prefecture. However, it's unclear what transmission or transmissions(s) they received. Some evidence suggests that Saichō did not receive the dual ( transmissions of the Diamond Realm and the Womb Realm. Instead, it is thought he may have only received the Diamond Realm transmission, but the evidence is not conclusive one way or the other.

Finally, on the tenth day of the fifth month of 805, Saichō and his party returned to Ningbo and after compiling further bibliographies, boarded the ship back for Japan and arrived in Tsushima on the fifth day of the sixth month. Although Saichō had only stayed in China for a total of eight months, his return was eagerly awaited by the court in Kyoto.

Founding of Tendai 

On his return from China, Saichō worked hard to win recognition from the court and "in the first month of 806, Saichō's Tendai Lotus school (Tendai-hokke-shū 天台法華宗) won official recognition when the court of the ailing emperor Kanmu issued another edict, this one permitting two annual ordinands (nenbundosha) for Saichō's new school on Mount Hiei. This edict states that, following Saichō's request, the ordinands would be divided between two curricula: the shanagō course, centering on the study of the Mahavairocana Sūtra (this was the Mikkyō curriculum, shana being the abbreviation for Birushana, the Japanese transliteration of Vairocana), and the shikangō course, based on the study of the Mo-ho chih-kuan, the seminal work of the T'ien-t'ai patriarch Chih-i 智顗 (538–597) (this was the Tendai curriculum, shikan being the Japanese reading of Chih-i's central practice of chih-kuan [cessation and contemplation]) (Kenkairon engi, DZ 1, pp. 294–296). Thus from its very inception the Tendai Lotus school was equally based on Mikkyō and T'ien-t'ai. It was as a subdivision of Saichō's new school that Mikkyō first received the official acknowledgment of the imperial court and became a proper subject of study in Japanese Buddhism.

Before Saichō, all monastic ordinations took place at Tōdai-ji temple under the ancient Vinaya code, but Saichō intended to found his school as a strictly Mahayana institution and ordain monks using the Bodhisattva Precepts only. Despite intense opposition from the traditional Buddhist schools in Nara, his request was granted by Emperor Saga in 822, several days after his death. This was the fruit of years of effort and a formal debate.

Decline and Death 
By 822, Saichō petitioned the court to allow the monks at Mount Hiei to ordain under the Bodhisattva Precepts rather than the traditional ordination system of the prātimokṣa, arguing that his community would be a purely Mahayana, not Hinayana one. This was met with strong protest by the Buddhist establishment who supported the kokubunji system, and lodged a protest.

Relationship with Kūkai 
Saichō traveled to China along with a number of other young monks, one of whom was named Kūkai. Saichō befriended him during his trip to China who traveled with him going and coming. This turned out to be pivotal to the future development of Buddhism.
, and likewise returned with esoteric (tantric) Buddhist texts. Saichō was entranced with the new material and wanted to learn more. On the trip back he found that Kukai had studied these teachings in depth and had an entire library of vajrayana materials. This friendship would influence the future of Tendai.

It was Saichō who performed the abhiṣeka, or initiatory ritual, for the court.

The identity of the purport of Perfect and Esoteric teachings 

Thus esoteric Buddhism became an important aspect of the Tendai school, which was primarily focused on the Lotus Sutra. However, unlike the Shingon school (which saw esoteric practice as superior to the Lotus Sutra), Saichō held to the "identity of the purport of Perfect and Esoteric teachings" (enmitsu itchi 円密一致) which means there is a unity and agreement among the teachings of the Lotus Sutra and Esoteric Buddhism."
Saichō, in a letter to Kukai, wrote:But the Vairocana school (shanashu 遮那宗) and Tendai interfuse with one another. They also share the same commentary.... There should be no such thing as preferring one to the other. The Lotus and the Golden Light are those texts to which the previous emperor [Kanmu] devoted himself, and there exists no difference between the One Unifying Vehicle [of Tendai] and Shingon.Paul Groner states,
 Tendai and Esoteric practices, he felt, provided a direct path (jikidō) to enlightenment, whereas the teachings of the Nara schools required aeons to bring the practitioner to enlightenment.

However,

Moreover, Saichō began to realize that his own idea of "enmitsu itchi" was not exactly shared by the esoteric Shingon school, and especially its founder Kūkai (Kōbō Daishi).

Ryuichi Abe writes,

Saichō's late life criticisms were ignored by his own leading disciples, and the Tendai would continue to teach Mikkyō and Shikangō (śamatha-vipaśyanā). Saichō's public condemnation of Kūkai would later form the seeds for some of the criticisms leveled by the founder of the Nichiren Sect, Nichiren, who would cite that work in his own debates.

Saichō was also an author. He wrote a number of texts, the main ones include:
 (817)
 (818–819)
 (818)
 (820)

See also
Tendai
Annen (monk)
Ennin

References

Further reading
 Pruden, Leo; Rhodes, Robert; trans. (1994). The Essentials of the Eight Traditions and The Candle of the Latter Dharma, Berkeley, CA: Numata Center for Buddhist Translation and Research.

External links
Saichō's Monastic Reforms

Japanese Buddhist clergy
767 births
822 deaths
Tendai
9th-century Japanese calligraphers
Japanese ambassadors to the Tang dynasty
Founders of Buddhist sects
Heian period Buddhist clergy